These are the international rankings of Brunei

International rankings
GDP per capita – 5th highest, at I$50,117
Human Development Index – 30th high, at 0.919
Literacy Rate – 75th, at 92.7%
Unemployment rate – 158th, at 4.00%

Health rankings
Fertility rate- 105th most fertile, at 2.29 per woman
Birth rate – 87th most births, at 21.58 per 1000 people
Infant mortality – 30th least deaths, at 5.5 per 1000 live births
Death rate – 191st highest death rate, at 2.8 per 1000 people
Life Expectancy – 43rd highest, at 77.1 years
HIV/AIDS rate – 123rd most cases, at 1000 people

References

Brunei